Cyclostrema annuliferum is a species of sea snail, a marine gastropod mollusk, in the family Liotiidae.

Description
The size of the shell attains 3 mm.

Distribution
This marine species occurs off West Africa.

References

Liotiidae